Huaxia Film Distribution is a Chinese film distribution company. In 2014, the company was the second-largest film distributor in China, gaining 22.89% of the market.

Filmography
Drug Wars (film) (2012)
The Taking of Tiger Mountain (2014)
Romance Out of the Blue (2015)
Lost in White (2016)
The BFG (2016)
Never Gone (2016)
A Busy Night (2016)
 A Chinese Odyssey Part Three (2016)
 Cock and Bull (2016)
Soul Mate (2016)
Mr. Donkey (2016)
Some Like It Hot (2016)
Out of Control (2017)
Love Contractually (2017)
Revenge for Love (2017)
Secret Superstar (2017)
UglyDolls (2019)
The Battle at Lake Changjin (2021)
The Battle at Lake Changjin 2 (2022)

References

Film distributors of China